Victoria Sendón de León (born 1942) is a Spanish philosopher, feminist and writer.

A difference feminist, Sendón de León has criticized equality feminism’s emphasis on rationality and ideals of equality:

Works
 Sobre diosas, amazonas y vestales: Utopías para un feminismo radical [On goddesses, Amazons and vestals: Utopias for a radical feminism], 1981
 La España herética, 1986
 Más allá de Itaca: sobre complicidades y conjuras, 1988
 Feminismo holístico: de la realidad a lo real, 1994
 Marcar las diferencias: discursos feministas ante un nuevo siglo, 2002
 Mujeres en la era global : contra un patriarcado neoliberal, 2003
 Matria: el horizonte de lo posible, 2006

References

1942 births
Living people
Spanish philosophers
Spanish feminists
Spanish women philosophers